Alex Cooper (born 4 November 1991) is a Scottish footballer who is a free agent and plays as a left-back. Cooper has previously played for Ross County, Elgin City (loan spell), Falkirk, St Mirren, Cheltenham Town, East Fife, Inverness Caledonian Thistle, Fresno in the USA, Sligo Rovers and Queen of the South. Cooper is also a former Liverpool youth player and also a former Scotland U17 youth international.

Career

Club career
Cooper began his playing career with Ross County's youth team. He immediately showed signs of great potential, sparking interest from several major clubs. At 14, he was invited to take part in a tournament in Switzerland with Jose Mourinho's Chelsea. and to train with both Celtic and Rangers. At the age of sixteen he went on a week-long trial to Liverpool which was cut short by injury. He returned a month later for a further three-day trial playing one match after which he was offered a contract.

He joined Liverpool on 28 December 2007 for a £100,000 fee signing a three-and-a-half-year contract. After his arrival he started playing for Liverpool's Academy before progressing to the Reserve side managed by John McMahon. During his time at Merseyside he suffered numerous injuries the most severe being a broken ankle ruling him out for six months during the 2009–10 season.

Cooper was released by Liverpool in the summer of 2011 along with three other players following the expiration of his contract. In the wake of his release, there was interest from a number of clubs, north and south of the border and Cooper eventually re-joined Ross County on 18 October 2011 until the end of the season after nearly a four-year absence from Dingwall. He appeared on the bench a day later for County's Scottish Cup tie against Albion Rovers but remained an unused substitute. He made his senior debut on 7 January 2012 as a substitute in a 7–0 victory against Stenhousemuir in a Scottish Cup fixture replacing teammate Paul Lawson. His next outing for County was again in the Scottish Cup, against SPL side St Mirren in a fifth round replay defeat.

On 16 March 2012, he joined Scottish Third Division side Elgin City on loan until the end of the season. He made his debut the following day, starting in a 2–2 draw with East Stirlingshire. Ross County were promoted to the Scottish Premier League with Cooper signing a new one-year contract in May 2012 keeping him at Dingwall until the end of the 2012–13 season. His performances during that season earnt him his club's Young Player of the Year award and subsequently a similar new deal for the 2013–14 season. Cooper scored his first league goal in spectacular style during the New Year's Day Derby against County's close rivals Inverness Caledonian Thistle which ultimately made the difference in a 2–1 win. At the end of the 2013–14 season, his father left his role as an assistant manager at Ross County and Cooper was among three players to be released.

On 3 July 2014, Cooper signed for Scottish Championship club Falkirk. He scored on his Falkirk debut, a 7–1 win against East Stirlingshire in the Scottish Challenge Cup. He was a substitute in the 2015 Scottish Cup Final squad.

On 29 January 2016, St Mirren signed Cooper until the end of the 2015–16 season after he was released from Falkirk. He was released by St Mirren at the end of the 2015–16 season.

On 8 October, Cooper signed for Cheltenham Town. The deal was completed in time for him to start in a match against Accrington Stanley. Cooper signed for Inverness Caledonian Thistle in July 2017. He was the part of the Inverness team that won the 17/18 challenge cup.

On 13 March 2018, Cooper joined United Soccer League side Fresno FC as a free agent.

In February 2020, he signed for Irish club Sligo Rovers. In August, Cooper scored a magnificent last minute freekick which secured a 2–1 win over Waterford FC. Cooper's goal proved to be invaluable as it helped the team to secure European football for the first time since 2013.

On 9 July 2021, Cooper signed for Dumfries club Queen of the South in the Scottish Championship on a one-year contract.

International career

Cooper made his international debut at the age of 14 and scored in a 1–1 draw for Scotland against Belgium, who had Eden Hazard playing. He represented Scotland at under-15 and under-16 levels including participation in the Victory Shield tournament. He also played for the Scotland under-17 side on seven occasions, featuring in the age group's European Championship. Cooper was involved in the UEFA under-17 European Championship in Turkey and named as a player to watch by UEFA.
He signed for League of Ireland Premier Division side Sligo Rovers on 20 February 2020, turning down offers to stay in the United States for a third season, in order to be closer to his family in Scotland.

Personal life
Cooper is the son of Neale Cooper, who played for Aberdeen and was the manager of Ross County.

Career statistics

References

External links
 
 

1991 births
Living people
Footballers from Inverness
Scottish footballers
Scotland youth international footballers
Association football midfielders
Scottish Premier League players
Scottish Football League players
Scottish Professional Football League players
Liverpool F.C. players
Ross County F.C. players
Elgin City F.C. players
Falkirk F.C. players
St Mirren F.C. players
Cheltenham Town F.C. players
Inverness Caledonian Thistle F.C. players
East Fife F.C. players
Fresno FC players
Sligo Rovers F.C. players
League of Ireland players
Scottish expatriate sportspeople in the United States
Expatriate soccer players in the United States
Scottish expatriate footballers
Expatriate association footballers in the Republic of Ireland
Queen of the South F.C. players